Nora Riordan Dannehy (born March 13, 1961) is an American attorney. She was appointed Acting United States Attorney for the District of Connecticut on April 4, 2008. She is the first woman to hold the office, which was established in 1789.

Legal career 
Dannehy received her B.A. from Wellesley College in 1983 and her J.D. degree from Harvard Law School in 1986. She joined the United States Department of Justice in 1991. Prior to her appointment, she had served as Professional Officer for the District of Connecticut.

Dannehy prosecuted political corruption in Connecticut and won convictions of former Connecticut Gov. John G. Rowland and former state Treasurer Paul Silvester.

On September 29, 2008, Dannehy was appointed by United States Attorney General Michael B. Mukasey to continue an investigation into the George W. Bush administration's dismissals of nine federal prosecutors in 2006. Her role was to determine if anyone should be prosecuted following the investigation by the Inspector General and Office of Professional Responsibility of the Department of Justice, which had concluded that political pressure drove the dismissals of at least three of the federal prosecutors in 2006. Her investigation concluded that "Evidence did not demonstrate that any prosecutable criminal offense was committed with regard to the removal of David Iglesias," "The investigative team also determined that the evidence did not warrant expanding the scope of the investigation beyond the removal of Iglesias," and that "there was insufficient evidence to charge someone with lying to Congress or investigators."

On December 10, 2010, Dannehy was named by Connecticut Attorney General elect George Jepsen to the post of Deputy Attorney General of the state.

On March 18, 2019, Dannehy returned to the U.S. Attorney's Office in Connecticut, as Counsel to John Durham. She was Durham's deputy on the Durham special counsel investigation into the origins of the FBI investigation into Russian interference in the 2016 elections. Dannehy unexpectedly resigned from the Justice Department in September 2020 without a public explanation. The New York Times reported in January 2023 that during the investigation she had a series of disputes with Durham about his and attorney general William Barr's prosecutorial ethics. She pressed Durham to ask Barr to adhere to DOJ policy by not publicly discussing the ongoing investigation; as one example, in April 2020 Barr said on Fox News that "the evidence shows that we are not dealing with just mistakes or sloppiness. There is something far more troubling here." Durham declined her request. Months before the 2020 presidential election, Barr asked Durham to prepare an interim report relating to the Hillary Clinton 2016 presidential campaign and FBI gullibility or willful blindness. After Dannehy learned that other Durham prosecutors had drafted such a report, which she said contained disputed information and should not be released just before an election, she erupted, sent colleagues a memo explaining her concerns, and resigned.

In 2021, she was named top legal aide to Connecticut governor Ned Lamont.

References

1961 births
Living people
People from Connecticut
United States Attorneys for the District of Connecticut
Harvard Law School alumni
Dismissal of U.S. attorneys controversy